Tanypovka (Tanıp) is a rural locality (a village) in Nizhnebaltachevsky Selsoviet, Tatyshlinsky District, Bashkortostan, Russia. The population was 101 as of 2010. There is one street.

Geography 
Tanypovka is located 30 km southeast of Verkhniye Tatyshly (the district's administrative centre) by road. Kytki-Yelga is the nearest rural locality.

References 

Rural localities in Tatyshlinsky District